Ravenscrag is an unincorporated community within the Rural Municipality of White Valley No. 49, Saskatchewan, Canada.

History 

Ravenscrag was once a community of over 100 people. Since the Great Depression, the town's population has dropped to one family.

The settlement gave its name to the Ravenscrag Formation, a stratigraphical unit of the Western Canadian Sedimentary Basin, defined in 1918 by N.B. Davis at Ravenscrag Butte. The formation lies north-east of the community.

See also 

 Scottish place names in Canada
 List of communities in Saskatchewan
 List of ghost towns in Canada
 Ghost towns in Saskatchewan

References 

White Valley No. 49, Saskatchewan
Unincorporated communities in Saskatchewan
Ghost towns in Saskatchewan
Division No. 4, Saskatchewan